Aghasalim Seyidahmed oglu Mirjavadov (born 11 April 1947, Baku, Azerbaijan SSR, USSR) is a soccer coach of Khazar Lankaran.

Achievements
Azerbaijan Premier League
Winner: 5
Runner-up:
Azerbaijan Cup
Winner:
CIS Cup
Winner: 2 (2006, 2008)
Individual

Shohrat Order: 2008

Personal life
Mirjavadov is a fan of mugham and his favourite writer is Chingiz Abdullayev.

References

1947 births
Living people
Azerbaijani footballers
Neftçi PFK managers
Qarabağ FK managers
Azerbaijani football managers
Azerbaijan national football team managers
Khazar Lankaran FK managers
Footballers from Baku
Association football defenders
Neftçi PFK players
Soviet Top League players
Soviet footballers
Soviet football managers
Soviet Azerbaijani people